The Barcelona Dragons was an American football team that was a part of the World League of American Football and later in the resurrected NFL Europe. Their home field in Barcelona was the Estadi Olímpic de Montjuic, the 1992 Olympic Stadium, and later the Mini Estadi.

The Dragons were successful on the field, making it to 4 World Bowls (1991, 1997, 1999, 2001) and winning World Bowl V in 1997.

History
The team was made part of the FC Barcelona organization in 2002 as the "FC Barcelona Dragons", which saw them move mid-season from the city's Olympic stadium to FC Barcelona's second stadium, the Mini Estadi, with its capacity of 15,276.

Despite these efforts, the franchise's fan support decreased and the team began to struggle financially.  After the 2003 season, the Dragons were discontinued and they were replaced in the league by the Cologne Centurions.

For the entire duration of the Dragons' history they had only one head coach, "Cowboy" Jack Bicknell. His nickname was translated by his adoptive city to El Caballero (with its additional connotations of "Knight" or "Gentleman" in Spanish).

From 1991 to 2002, Seymour "Red" Kelin was responsible for Defensive Coordinating duties. Bicknell and Kelin had been coaching together since their days at Boston College, where they helped lead the Eagles to a Cotton Bowl Classic victory in 1984.

In 2021, an unrelated entity of the same name was founded to participate in the inaugural season of the new European League of Football. This new team has announced the Estadi Municipal de Reus as their home field for their participation in this new league.

Season-by-season
The Dragons lost the inaugural World Bowl 21–0 to the London Monarchs in 1991. The game was played at Wembley Stadium in front of more than 60,000 fans.

That was to be the first of four World Bowl appearances for the Dragons, with the second bringing their first success in 1997. In an extremely tight group stage that year, the Dragons finished second with a .500 record, and then beat Rhein Fire 38–24 in the final.

That would prove to be the Dragons' only trophy, but they made it to the World Bowl twice more, losing 38–24 to Frankfurt Galaxy in 1999, and 24–17 to Berlin Thunder in 2001. In both years they had finished top of the regular season standings.

Head coaches

External links

 The Football Database

 
NFL Europe (WLAF) teams
FC Barcelona
1991 establishments in Spain
2003 disestablishments in Spain
Defunct American football teams in Catalonia
Sports clubs in Barcelona
American football teams established in 1991
American football teams disestablished in 2003